Rodrigo Esmail (born 8 August 1995) is an Argentine professional footballer who plays as a defender.

Club career
Esmail's career began with Atlanta. He made his first-team debut after featuring for the full duration of a Primera B Metropolitana draw away to Almagro on 13 November 2015, with three more appearances coming in the 2016 campaign as they finished second; two points off promotion. In August 2016, Esmail was loaned to Uruguayan Segunda División side Cerro Largo. He appeared nine times for the club, including on 26 November when he scored his first senior goal in a three-goal victory against Deportivo Maldonado. Having returned to Atlanta, Esmail left on loan again on 30 June 2017 to Primera C Metropolitana's Cañuelas.

Esmail left Atlanta in the summer 2019.

International career
Esmail received a call-up from Julio Olarticoechea to represent the Argentina U23s at the 2016 Sait Nagjee Trophy in Kozhikode, India.

Career statistics
.

References

External links

1995 births
Living people
Footballers from Buenos Aires
Argentine footballers
Association football defenders
Argentine expatriate footballers
Expatriate footballers in Uruguay
Argentine expatriate sportspeople in Uruguay
Primera B Metropolitana players
Uruguayan Segunda División players
Primera C Metropolitana players
Club Atlético Atlanta footballers
Cerro Largo F.C. players
Cañuelas footballers